The  ("Encyclopedia", lit. "knowledge word-book", "knowledge dictionary"), published in 11 volumes from 1909 to 1922, was the first Finnish language encyclopedia. It was published by Tietosanakirja-Osakeyhtiö, a joint effort between Otava and WSOY. The name of the series was adopted into the Finnish language to mean all encyclopedias, so to differentiate, the series became colloquially known as Iso musta tietosanakirja ("the Big Black Encyclopedia").

It was followed by the abridged , "Small Encyclopedia", published in 4 volumes, 1925–1928.

External links

Tietosanakirja at Project Runeberg.

Finnish-language encyclopedias
Finnish non-fiction books
1909 non-fiction books
20th-century encyclopedias
Finnish encyclopedias